The Italians in Romania are people of Italian descent who reside, or have moved to Romania.

Characteristics
They are an ethnic minority in Romania, numbering 3,203 people according to the 2011 census. Italians are fairly dispersed throughout the country, even though there is a higher number of them in some parts of the country (particularly Suceava County, Bacău County, Galați County, Iași County, Constanța County, Brașov County, Prahova County, Vâlcea County and Timiș County), and in the Municipality of Bucharest.

As an officially recognised ethnic minority, Italians have one seat reserved in the Romanian Chamber of Deputies. This was held by the Italian Community of Romania between 1992 and 2004, and the Association of Italians of Romania since 2004.

In recent years, the number of foreign-born Italians living in Romania has increased substantially. As of November 2007, there are some 12,000 foreign-born Italians in and around Timișoara. About 3,000 square kilometres of land (2% of the agricultural land of Romania) have been bought by Italians. Many are married to Romanians that they met in Italy, which now has the largest Romanian population in the world outside of Romania and Moldova.

According to Eurostat, in 2015 there were 38,580 persons born in Italy living in Romania.

History
The territory of today's Romania has been part of the Italians' (especially Genoese and Venetians) trade routes on the Danube since at least the 13th century. They founded several ports on the Danube, including Vicina (near Isaccea), Sfântu Gheorghe, San Giorgio (Giurgiu) and Calafat.

During the 19th and 20th centuries, many Italians from Western Austria-Hungary settled in Transylvania. During the interwar period, some Italians settled in Dobruja.

After 1880, Italians from Friuli and Veneto settled in Greci, Cataloi and Măcin in Northern Dobruja. Most of them worked in the granite quarries in the Măcin Mountains, some became farmers and others worked in road building.

Genoese lighthouse of Constanța
Soaring , a lighthouse called Farul Genovez - the Genoese Lighthouse - was built in 1860 by the "Danubius and Black Sea Company" to honor Genoese merchants who established a flourishing sea trade community in Constanța in the 13th century.

Notable Italians of Romania 
 Gaspar Graziani, ruler of Moldavia
 Mansi Barberis (1899–1986), music composer
 Livio Bellegante
 Florin Bogardo
  (1921–2007), movie director
 
 Mircea Grosaru (1952–2014), politician, lawyer, professor
  
 Horia Moculescu
 Alexandru Pesamosca
 Andi Gabriel Grosaru, Lawyer, Deputy
 Simone Tempestini, Romanian rally champion

See also 
Italy–Romania relations
Italian emigration

References

External links
  Associazione degli Italiani della Romania (in Italian)

 
 
 
Romania
Romania
Ethnic groups in Romania